Pengkalan Batu or Pangkalan Batu may refer to:

Brunei 

 Kampong Pengkalan Batu, village in Brunei-Muara District
 Mukim Pengkalan Batu, mukim of Brunei-Muara District

Malaysia 

 Pengkalan Batu (state constituency), state constituency in Malacca